Karl Palda (14 April 1907 — 1986) was an Austrian chess player, Austrian Chess Championship winner (1931).

Biography
In 1931, Karl Palda shared 1st place in Austrian Chess Championship. Also he in Austrian Unofficial Chess Championship won bronze (1924) medal. Karl Palda was participant in several international chess tournaments.

Karl Palda played for Austria in the Chess Olympiads:
 In 1950, at fourth board in the 9th Chess Olympiad in Dubrovnik (+1, =4, -4),
 In 1952, at reserve board in the 10th Chess Olympiad in Helsinki (+0, =2, -3).

Also Karl Palda with Austria team participated in the Clare Benedict Chess Cup (1960).

References

External links

Karl Palda chess games at 365chess.com

1907 births
1986 deaths
Austrian chess players
Chess Olympiad competitors
20th-century chess players